Blue Iguana is a 2018 British romantic comedy thriller film written and directed by Hadi Hajaig. The film stars Sam Rockwell, Phoebe Fox, Danny Granger, Ben Schwartz, Peter Ferdinando, Simon Callow, Al Weaver, Robin Hellier, and Frances Barber.

The film was released theatrically in the United States on 24 August 2018.

Synopsis 
Eddie (Sam Rockwell) and Paul (Ben Schwartz) are a couple of low-level petty criminals, who are working out their parole in a New York diner. Enter British lawyer Katherine (Phoebe Fox), who offers them ready cash to come to London and intercept a valuable package in transit. The duo arrives in London, team up with their British confederate Tommy Tresham (Al Weaver) and snatch the bag in the main hall of the Natural History Museum. This puts them on the wrong side of psychotic local villain Deacon Bradshaw (Peter Ferdinando) and his boss Arkardy (Peter Polycarpou). They learn that Arkady and Bradshaw are planning to steal a fabulous gem called the Blue Iguana and decide to stake out Bradshaw's pub in a bid to nab the gem for themselves.

Cast
 Sam Rockwell as Eddie
 Ben Schwartz as Paul Driggs
 Phoebe Fox as Katherine Rookwood
 Amanda Donohoe as Dawn Bradshaw
 Simon Callow as Uncle Martin
 Peter Ferdinando as Deacon Bradshaw
 Al Weaver as Tommy Tresham
 Peter Polycarpou as Arkady
 Frances Barber as Princess
 Danny Granger as Stephane 
 Vic Waghorn as Micky Oyl

Production
Hajaig has stated that the film is his homage to American indie movies of the 1980s:

The film was shot in London. One large sequence was shot in the main hall of London's Natural History Museum. The 35 mm format 4k Arriflex Amira camera was chosen, as its adaptability served the indie look the film  makers strove to achieve. Director of photography Ian Howes worked to ensure the film maintained a filmic and analogue styling to reference American indie films of the 1980s. Londoner Peter Ferdinando maintained Deacon Bradshaw's South Yorkshire accent on and off the set throughout the shoot. Sam Rockwell's attempt at a Cockney accent is a key running gag.

Reception

References

External links
 

2018 films
2018 romantic comedy films
2018 thriller films
2010s comedy thriller films
2010s English-language films
2010s romantic thriller films
British comedy thriller films
British romantic comedy films
British romantic thriller films
2010s British films